The X Factor is an Australian television reality music competition that first aired in 2005. As of 2015, there have been seven seasons; one on Network Ten and six on the Seven Network. The final round of the competition features a number of solo singers and vocal groups: nine for season 1, twelve for seasons 2, 3, 4, 5, 7 and 8, and thirteen for season 6. A total of 94 acts have reached the finals of their seasons. Season three winner Reece Mastin is the most successful contestant from the show, having attained two top-five albums and three number-one singles, with nine platinum and three gold certifications.

During season 1, the contestants were split into three categories: 16-24s (soloists aged 16 to 24), Over 25s (soloists aged 25 and over) and Groups (including duos). Each category was mentored by Mark Holden, Kate Ceberano and John Reid. From season 2 onwards, the 16-24s category was split into separate male and female sections, making four categories in all: Boys, Girls, Over 25s and Groups. The judging panel was replaced by Guy Sebastian, Natalie Imbruglia, Ronan Keating and Kyle Sandilands who is the additional fourth judge. In season three, Natalie Bassingthwaighte and Mel B joined the judging panel as replacements for Imbruglia and Sandilands. Dannii Minogue and Redfoo replaced Mel B and Sebastian in season 5. In series 5, the over 25s were changed to over 24s, before being changed back to over 25s for series 6.  Sebastian returned in season 7 along with Chris Isaak and James Blunt to replace Redfoo, Bassingthwaighte and Keating. In season 8, boys and girls has been defunct and making the 14-21s to come back, the over 25s category was changed to over 22s. Mel B returned in 8 along with Iggy Azalea and Adam Lambert to replace Minogue, Issak and Blunt.

Contestants

Key:
 – Winner
 – Runner-up
 – Disqualified

Notes

A Josh Brookes was disqualified when it was revealed that he "behaved in an inappropriate manner" on social media. He was later replaced by Carmelo Munzone.

References

External links
 The X Factor at Yahoo!7

Australian television-related lists
Lists of reality show participants